The 1994 Canadian Senior Curling Championships, Canada's national championship for curlers over 50, were held March 19 to 26, 1994 at the Hillcrest Sports Centre in Moose Jaw, Saskatchewan. 

Alberta, skipped by Cordella "Red" Schwengler won the women's event, defeating Newfoundland's Sue Anne Bartlett in the final. The Alberta rink had been adopted as the fan favourites in the final, as their third Betty Clarke was a native-Saskatchewanian. The team went undefeated in the round robin before losing their last two games, settling for third place heading into the playoffs. The opposing skip, Sue Anne Bartlett, was playing in her first senior championship. At the time, she had a record 12 appearances at the Scott Tournament of Hearts Canadian women's championships, and had lost just one round robin match.

New Brunswick, skipped by David Sullivan won the men's event, defeating British Columbia's Jim Horswell rink. The win added a trophy to the list of Sullivan family accolades which included a win by his son Jim and nephew Charlie and at the 1988 World Junior Curling Championships, where David was the coach.

Men's

Teams
The men's teams were as follows:

Standings
Final round-robin standings.

Playoffs
Due to the four-way tie for first, a four team playoff was adopted rather than the usual three.

Final
March 26, 1:00pm

Women's

Teams
The women's teams were as follows:

Standings
Final round-robin standings.

Playoffs

Final 
March 26, 1:00pm

References
 

1994 in Canadian curling
Canadian Senior Curling Championships
Curling in Saskatchewan
1994 in Saskatchewan
Sport in Moose Jaw
March 1994 sports events in Canada